Bangla Band Day also known as বাংলা ব্যান্ড দিবস, is observed on 13 December since 2014  to celebrate Bangla Band music.

The day was marked by Kaushik Chakraborty (vocalist of bangla band, Prithibi) at a tribute concert called 'Hawae Melechi Pakhna' at Golf Green, Kolkata.

History
On 13 December 2014, a tribute concert called ' Hawae Melechi Pakhna' was organised in memory of Kutty Mazumder, the vocalist of a renowned bangla band, Abhilasha. His band members Raja Mukherjee and Satyadev Barman along with Kaushik Chakraborty of Prithibi were instrumental in putting up the concert. The day witnessed a huge number of top brass bangla bands from Kolkata, India getting together to pay Kutty a tribute.

Kaushik marked the day as 'Bangla Band Day' as the 13th was almost a renaissance for Bangla Band fraternity. It was quite a long period when so many bangla band musicians had come together. Not only that the musicians did not restrict themselves to their personal bands, but mix and matched to perform that night.

References

 Calcutta Times Times of India report of the day

External links
 Calcutta Times Times of India report of the day
 Hawae melechi pakhna concert Video of the concert

Bengali music
Music festivals established in 2014
Culture of West Bengal
Music festivals in India